José Misael Roldán Concha (born ), better known as The Jackal of Pupunahue was a Chilean iron miner known for the brutal murder of a woman and five of her seven children while on probation for an earlier murder. Although he was originally sentenced to death, then-president Carlos Ibáñez del Campo granted him a Presidential pardon, essentially reducing his sentence to life in prison.

Biography 
Roldán Concha came from a poor family, being the 10th out of 14 siblings. He dropped out from school at 13 years of age and began working in agriculture and coal mining. Roldán was described as an untalkative and robust man, as he weighed 80 kilograms and was 1.70 meters tall.

Murders 

In 1954, during his work in coal mining, he got into a fight with a foreman after being fired for arguing with a higher-up over his paycheck. The foreman hit Roldán with a lamp, to which Roldán responded by hitting him in the head with a wooden stick, killing the man. He subsequently attempted to escape to Argentina, but eventually surrendered to the police after his sister convinced him to do so and was sentenced to five years of prison to be served at a Victoria prison. Because of good behavior, Roldán was given probation after his first year in prison. Hours before the murder, Roldán had been at the police station of Antilhue to sign, as this was a condition of the probation. 

In the night of June 7, 1957 Roldán, who was in a state of heavy inebriation, had dinner with his elderly parents and some of his brothers at the Los Copihues iron mine camp. He then went to buy fruit at the shop of Laura Díaz Díaz, a neighbour of his family and wife of his colleague Custodio Gómez Chacón, grabbing a iron bar on the way. According to his later declarations, Roldán had gone to Díaz's shop to buy fruit because he was thirsty after drinking. Laura's husband was by then working at a night shift in the coal mine at the time. Once Laura got back with the oranges José Misael had ordered he began an unprovoked and indiscriminate attack with the bar, killing Laura along with five of children (aged 1 to 14), along with gravely injuring 11-year old Nora, daughter of Laura, who, after being hit and having all of her teeth knocked out, hid under a bed. 

The murders occurred in the locality of Pupunahue in the commune of Máfil, southern Chile. At the time of the murder, Roldán was 27 years old. Reportedly the murders were followed by acts of necrophilia with Díaz' corpse and attempted arson to erase evidence by setting fire to a mattress before escaping into a nearby forest.

Aftermath 
The murder became known when Nora Gómez Díaz, whom Roldán believed to be dead, woke up following the attack, put out the fire that Roldán started, and reported the actions to local police, who caught him after an all-night hunt. Roldán confessed to the murders, but refused to give a motive or confess to the necrophilic acts. Later on, he admitted that alcoholism played a part, along with detailing how he felt an urge to abuse Díaz corpse after he saw that she wasn't wearing underwear at the time of her death.

Upon hearing about this, the local community was outraged and demanded the death penalty, which he was later condemned to by the second court of Valdivia and upheld by the Supreme Court of Chile. However, then-President Carlos Ibáñez del Campo eventually got involved in the case, granting clemency to Roldán, whose sentence was then reduced to life imprisonment. 

José Misael Roldán spent the rest of his life in prison without any parole benefits, where he eventually passed away. The house in which the 1957 murders occurred was later demolished and replaced with a bust honoring the six victims.

See also
The Jackal of Nahueltoro

References

1930 births
Prisoners sentenced to life imprisonment by Chile
Chilean prisoners sentenced to life imprisonment
Chilean people convicted of murder
Chilean mass murderers
People from Valdivia Province

Chilean serial killers